The 2015 Africa Cup of Nations was an international football tournament hosted by Equatorial Guinea from 17 January to 8 February 2015.

Group A

Equatorial Guinea 
Coach:  Esteban Becker

The final squad was announced on 8 January 2015.

Burkina Faso 
Coach:  Paul Put

A 24-man provisional squad was announced on 23 December 2014.

Gabon 
Coach:  Jorge Costa

The final squad was announced on 28 December 2014.

Congo 
Coach:  Claude Le Roy

A 26-man provisional squad was announced on 22 December 2014. The final squad was announced on 7 January 2015.

Group B

Zambia 
Coach:  Honour Janza

A 27-man provisional squad was announced on 24 December 2014. The final squad was announced on 7 January 2015.

Tunisia 
Coach:  Georges Leekens

A 26-man provisional squad was announced on 27 December 2014. The final squad was announced on 7 January 2015.

Cape Verde 
Coach:  Rui Águas

The final squad was announced on 24 December 2014.

DR Congo 
Coach:  Florent Ibengé

A 29-man provisional squad was announced on 29 December 2014.

Group C

Ghana 
Coach:  Avram Grant

A 31-man provisional squad was announced on 24 December 2014. The final squad was announced on 7 January 2015.

Algeria 
Coach:  Christian Gourcuff

The final squad was announced on 16 December 2014.

South Africa 
Coach:  Ephraim Mashaba

A 34-man provisional squad was announced on 18 December 2014, before the final list announcement on 30 December.

Senegal 
Coach:  Alain Giresse

A 28-man provisional squad was announced on 26 December 2014. The final squad was announced on 7 January 2015.

Group D

Ivory Coast 
Coach:  Hervé Renard

The final squad was announced on 29 December 2014.

Mali 
Coach:  Henryk Kasperczak

A 35-man provisional squad was announced on 27 December 2014. The final squad was announced the following day.

Cameroon 
Coach:   Volker Finke

A 24-man provisional squad was announced on 24 December 2014.

Guinea 
Coach:   Michel Dussuyer

The final squad was announced on 30 December 2014.

Player representation

By club
Clubs with 3 or more players represented are listed.

By club nationality

By club federation

By representatives of domestic league

References

External links 
 Official lists of players, CAFonline.com

2015
Squads